Daniel Thomas Elmer (December 8, 1915 – March 17, 2002) was an American football player and coach. He served as the head football coach at Augsburg College in 1939 after playing college football for the Minnesota Golden Gophers football team from 1934 to 1938.

Elmer was drafted by the Green Bay Packers in the 1939 NFL Draft.

References

External links
 

1915 births
2002 deaths
American football centers
Minnesota Golden Gophers football players
Augsburg Auggies football coaches
Sports coaches from Minneapolis
Players of American football from Minneapolis